The men's 400 metre individual medley event at the 2004 Olympic Games was contested at the Olympic Aquatic Centre of the Athens Olympic Sports Complex in Athens, Greece on August 14.

U.S. swimmer Michael Phelps broke a new world record of 4:08.26 to claim his first ever Olympic gold medal. Phelps' teammate Erik Vendt added a second silver to the one he earned behind Tom Dolan in Sydney four years earlier, finishing with a time of 4:11.81. Hungary's László Cseh, silver medalist at the 2003 FINA World Championships, held on for bronze in 4:12.15.

Records
Prior to this competition, the existing world and Olympic records were as follows.

The following new world and Olympic records were set during this competition.

Results

Heats

Final

References

External links
Official Olympic Report

M
Men's events at the 2004 Summer Olympics